Yangi Arakh (also Romanized as Yangī Arakh, Yengī Arkh, and Yengī Erkh; also known as Arīkeh, Arikeha, and Arīkeheh) is a village in Kowleh Rural District, Saral District, Divandarreh County, Kurdistan Province, Iran. At the 2006 census, its population was 315, in 64 families. The village is populated by Kurds.

References 

Towns and villages in Divandarreh County
Kurdish settlements in Kurdistan Province